Mahan Rahmani; is an Iranian Football midfielder.

Club career

Saipa
He started his career with Saipa from youth levels. In July 2013 he joined to first team by Engin Firat. He made his debut for Saipa on April 6, 2014 against Malavan as a substitute for Roozbeh Shahalidoost.

Persepolis
On 5 July 2016, Rahmani signed with Iranian giants Persepolis.

Club career statistics

International career

U17
He was part of Iran U–17 in 2012 AFC U-16 Championship.

U20
He invited to Iran U–20 by Ali Dousti Mehr to preparation for 2014 AFC U-19 Championship.

References

External links
 Mahan Rahmani at PersianLeague.com
 Mahan Rahmani at IranLeague.ir
 Mahan Rahmani at FootballTehran.com
Mahan Rahmani on instagram

1996 births
Living people
Iranian footballers
Mahan Rahmani
Expatriate footballers in Thailand
Saipa F.C. players
Iran under-20 international footballers
Association football midfielders